Chikman is a rural locality (a settlement) in Skopkortnenskoye Rural Settlement, Alexandrovsky District, Perm Krai, Russia. The population was 23 as of 2010. There are 4 streets.

Geography 
Chikman is located 58 km northeast of Alexandrovsk (the district's administrative centre) by road. Skopkortnaya is the nearest rural locality.

References 

Rural localities in Alexandrovsky District